Mahaveer public school stands on a 2.68 acre (10,844  m²) plot of land allotted free of cost in 1946 by His Highness Sawai Man Singh II, the last Maharajah of Jaipur State. The school is affiliated with the Board of Secondary Education(CBSE), Rajasthan. The School has three locations.

Facilities

Library
The library has 64,000 books and a research centre on Jainism, in which rare ancient literature is available. Book Bank facilities are available for poor students and special facilities have been created for meritorious and weak students.  They are permitted to draw as many books as they need and they are also permitted to purchase books and prepare for examination.  The books are repurchased after the examinations. Newspaper and magazines in a reading room are available for teachers and students.

Assembly Hall 
It can accommodate 500 children. The hall has facilities for staging dramas and plays.

Audio/visual room
The room has LCD, overhead projectors, and a recording system.

Game facilities 
 Playgrounds
 Covered badminton court, football, hockey, volleyball, basketball grounds.

City
Jaipur

References 

Educational institutions established in 1946
Schools in Jaipur
1946 establishments in India